Hindsiclava perspirata is an extinct species of sea snail, a marine gastropod mollusc in the family Pseudomelatomidae, the turrids and allies.

Description
The length of the shell attains 29 mm, its diameter 10 mm.

(Original description) This species differs from the recent Hindsiclava alesidota (Dall, 1889) and Hindsiclava macilenta (Dall, 1889) in its shorter whorls, its proportionally greater stoutness, coarser and rounder spiral sculpture, a more constricted anal fasciole and a stronger and more angular band between the fasciole and the suture. The number of whorls is about the same in both.

Distribution
Fossils of this marine species were found in Pliocene strata in Florida, USA; age range: 3.6 to 0.781 Ma

References

 W. P. Woodring. 1970. Geology and paleontology of canal zone andadjoiningg parts of Panama: Description of Tertiary mollusks (gastropods: Eulimidae, Marginellidae to Helminthoglyptidae). United States Geological Survey Professional Paper 306(D):299-452

External links
 Fossilworks: † Crassispira (Hindsiclava) perspirata

perspirata
Gastropods described in 1890